Sharon Egretta Sutton (born 1941), is an American architect, educator, visual artist, and author. Her work is focused on community-based participatory research and design. She is a professor emerita at the University of Washington. In 1984, she became the first African American woman to become a full professor in an accredited architectural degree program while teaching at the University of Michigan. She has also taught at Parsons School of Design, and Columbia University.

Early life and education 
Sharon Egretta Sutton was born on 1941 in Cincinnati, Ohio. Sutton began taking piano lessons at age 5 from the organist at her mother's church at a time when colored people were barred from going to the swimming pool, skating rink, and movie theater in her segregated Cincinnati neighborhood. She was introduced to the French horn at her college prep high school where all students had to study one of the arts alongside their academic courses. 

Sutton was educated initially in music, studying French horn with Gunther Schuller first at the Manhattan School of Music in 1959; and latter at the Hartt College of Music at the University of Hartford, where she received a B.A. degree in 1963. After earning a degree in 1963, Sutton worked as a professional musician in New York City, most notably for Sol Hurok Attractions and in the original cast of Man of La Mancha. She also performed at symphony orchestras, in Radio City Music Hall, on Broadway, and had over a thousand performances in Man of La Mancha.

In 1967, Sutton enrolled in Parsons School of Design. She later studied architecture at Columbia University, where she was mentored by J. Max Bond, Jr. and Romaldo Giurgola. She earned her M.Arch. in 1973 and opened a private practice in 1976. In 1982, she received her M.Phil and Ph.D. in psychology from the City University of New York (CUNY).

Career

Teaching and writing 
Sutton's focus is community-based participatory research and design with a special emphasis on low-income and minority youth and other disenfranchised populations. Her research has been funded by the Ford Foundation, National Endowment for the Arts, W.K. Kellogg Foundation, Hewlett Foundation, Tukwila School District, the University of Michigan, and University of Washington, among others.

She is a distinguished visiting professor at Parsons School of Design, an adjunct professor at Columbia University, and professor emerita at the University of Washington where she served on the faculty 1998 to 2016.

Sutton is author of When Ivory Towers Were Black: A Story about Race in America's Cities and Universities (2017); Weaving a Tapestry of Resistance: The Places, Power and Poetry of a Sustainable Society (1996); and Learning through the Built Environment (1985). Additionally, she is author of numerous book chapters and journal articles, and is co-editor of The Paradox of Urban Space: Inequality and Transformation in Marginalized Communities.

Sutton is also a noted printmaker and collagist, having studied graphic art. Her work has been exhibited in and collected by galleries and museums, business enterprises, colleges, and universities, and is part of the Robert Blackburn Collection at the Library of Congress.

Dedicated to improving the living environments of disenfranchised populations, Sutton is currently ethnographic consultant to design studio instructors at Parsons School of Design. Most of Sutton's scholarship explores America's continuing struggle for racial justice.

Architecture 
A registered architect, Sutton was the twelfth African American woman to be licensed to practice architecture (1976), the first to be promoted to full professor of architecture (1994), and the second to be elected a Fellow in the American Institute of Architects (1995).  The ACSA (Association of Collegiate Schools of Architecture) honored Sutton with the ACSA Distinguished Professor Award in 1995–96.  Sutton received the "Life Recognition Award" from the Michigan Women's Hall of Fame in 1997 and the national American Institute of Architects Whitney M. Young, Jr., Award in 2011. In 2014 and 2017 respectively, she received the AIA Seattle Medal of Honor and the AIA New York Medal of Honor, the highest awards chapters can confer.

Sutton's career as an architect started after she was licensed by New York State as an architect.  She started practicing architecture and fine art in a 5th Avenue loft and also started teaching at Pratt Institute and later at Columbia University.

Sutton left Columbia University for the University of Cincinnati before she was recruited to the University of Michigan where she became the first African American woman to become a full professor of architecture, the 2nd to be elevated to fellowship in the AIA, and the 1st to serve as president of the National Architectural Accrediting Board, concluding by being inducted into the Michigan Women's Hall of Fame.

Sutton eventually accepted a professorship position at the University of Washington where she was a principal investigator of Ford Foundation study civic engagement by low – income youths, this work earned her an award as the second African American woman to receive the AIA Whitney M. Young, Jr. award.

During this period, Sutton served on the Seattle Design Commission and chaired the Capitol Hill Design Review Board, public service that earned her the American Institute of Architects ((AIA) Seattle Chapter Community Service award and Medal of Honor award.

Books
 Sutton, Sharon E., "Pedagogy of a Beloved Commons: Pursuing Democracy's Promise through Place-Based Activism," Fordham University Press, New York, 2023. 
 Sutton, Sharon E., "When Ivory Towers Were Black: A Story about Race in America's Cities and Universities," Fordham University Press, New York, 2017. 
 Sutton, Sharon E., and Kemp, Susan P., editors, The Paradox of Urban Space: Inequality and Transformation in Marginalized Communities, Palgrave Macmillan, New York, 2011  
 Sutton, Sharon E., Weaving a Tapestry of Resistance: The Places, Power, and Poetry of a Sustainable Society, Bergin and Garvey Publishers, Westport, 1996.
 Sutton, Sharon E., Learning through the Built Environment: An Ecological Approach to Child Development, Irvington Press, New York, 1985.

Book chapters and articles 

 Sharon E. Sutton (2015).  Foreword; and Chapter eleven: reality-based learning in design studio education.  In Carla Jackson Bell (Ed.), Space Unveiled (pp. xvi–xvii and pp,102–112).  New York: Routledge Research in Architecture Series.
 Sharon E. Sutton (2011). Struggling for the right to housing: a critical analysis of the evolution of West Seattle's High Point. In The Paradox of Urban Space (pp. 29–51).
 Sharon E. Sutton and Susan P. Kemp (2011).  Introduction: place as marginality and possibility.  In The Paradox of Urban Space, pp. 1–9.
 Sharon E. Sutton and Susan P. Kemp (2011).  Place: a site of social and environmental inequity.  In The Paradox of Urban Space (pp. 13–28).
 Sharon E. Sutton and Susan P. Kemp (2011).  Place: a site of individual and collective transformation.  In The Paradox of Urban Space (pp. 113–134).
 Sharon E. Sutton and Susan P. Kemp (2011).  Conclusions: Standing shoulder-to- shoulder in a place-conscious society.  In The Paradox of Urban Space (pp. 259–265).
 Sharon E. Sutton (2008).  Engaging the public, seeking common ground; and Discovering the power of youth. In  Nancy B. Solomon (ed.), Architecture: Celebrating the Past, Designing the Future (pp. 64–77;and pp. 84).  New York: Visual Reference Inc.; Washington, DC: The American Institute of Architects.
 Sharon E. Sutton (2007).  A social justice perspective on youth and community development: theorizing the processes and outcomes of participation.  Children, Youth, and Environments, 17 (2), 616–645.  [Available online at: http://www.colorado. edu/journals/cye].
 Sharon E. Sutton and Susan P. Kemp (2006, September).  Integrated social science and design inquiry through interdisciplinary design charrettes: an approach to participatory community problem-solving.  American Journal of Community Psychology, 38 (1–2), 125–139.

 Sharon E. Sutton and Susan P. Kemp (2005).  Children's participation in constructing a social just public sphere.  In Mark Blades and Christopher Spencer (eds.), Children and Their Environments: Learning, Using, and Designing Spaces (pp. 256–276).  Cambridge, UK: Cambridge University Press.

Awards and honors 

 Beverly Willis Architecture Foundation Oculus
 2017 American Institute of Architects, New York Chapter Medal of Honor Award
 2014 American Institute of Architects, Seattle Chapter Medal of Honor Award
 2011 American Institute of Architects (AIA) Whitney M. Young, Jr. Award
 2006 American Architectural Foundation K-12 Architectural Education Award of Merit for CEEDS
 2005 American Institute of Architects (AIA), Seattle Chapter Community Service Award
 1999 Jeannette and David McKinley Fellowship
 Faculty Research Support
 1997 Michigan Women's Hall of Fame Life Recognition Award
 1996 Association of Collegiate Schools of Architecture Distinguished Professor Award
 1995 American Institute of Architects Elevation to Fellowship
 1992 University of Michigan Regents Award for Distinguished Public Service
 1991 American Planning Association Education Award for Teaching the Public about Planning
 1989 UM School of Business Administration
 First Round Award, National Zell Lurie Fellowship
 19861989 W.K. Kellogg Foundation Group VII National Fellowship
 1983 National Endowment for the Arts Design Research Recognition Award

See also 

 African-American architects
 Charles F. McAfee

Notes

External links
 Sarah Akigbogun, "In Conversation … Sharon Egretta Sutton" Parlour, 6 October 2019
https://cfa.aiany.org/index.php?section=designawardsluncheon
 AIA Seattle Honors Archive
 artdaily.org on Whitney M. Young Jr. Award
 https://www.citylab.com/design/2017/05/black-architectural-insurgency-in-the-trump-era/527316/
 http://community.seattletimes.nwsource.com/archive/?date=20030128&slug=sutton28
 http://old.seattletimes.com/html/opinion/2008042591_archop10.html

1941 births
Living people
African-American academics
20th-century American architects
Architects from Seattle
American printmakers
Graduate Center, CUNY alumni
Columbia Graduate School of Architecture, Planning and Preservation alumni
Columbia University faculty
Hunter College alumni
Manhattan School of Music alumni
Parsons School of Design alumni
Pratt Institute faculty
University of Michigan faculty
Fellows of the American Institute of Architects
Educators from Seattle
University of Washington faculty
University of Hartford alumni
University of Cincinnati faculty
American women architects
American women printmakers
21st-century American women artists
American women academics
21st-century African-American women
21st-century African-American artists
African-American architects
20th-century African-American people
20th-century African-American women
21st-century American architects